Christine Jolls (born October 1, 1967) is the Gordon Bradford Tweedy Professor of Law and Organization at Yale Law School, where she has been since 2006. She is known for her work in the emerging theory of behavioral economics and law. Her areas of research include employment law and contracts. She received her B.A. in economics from Stanford University, a Ph.D. in economics from the Massachusetts Institute of Technology and her J.D. from Harvard Law School. She was a law clerk to Supreme Court Justice Antonin Scalia and taught at Harvard Law School. She collaborates with Professor Cass Sunstein of Harvard Law School.

Selected publications

See also 
 List of law clerks of the Supreme Court of the United States (Seat 9)

References

External links 
 The Yale Law School profile of Professor Jolls

1967 births
Living people
Law clerks of the Supreme Court of the United States
Stanford University alumni
MIT School of Humanities, Arts, and Social Sciences alumni
Yale Law School faculty
Harvard Law School alumni
American women lawyers
American lawyers
American legal scholars
American women legal scholars
American women academics
21st-century American women